Aleksandar Marković (born in Belgrade, August 7, 1975) is a Serbian conductor.

Marković studied conducting at the Universität für Musik und darstellende Kunst (Vienna), in the class of Leopold Hager.  He earned a Diploma d'onore at the Accademia Musicale Chigiana in Siena, where he attended a master class in conducting.  He was a holder of the Herbert von Karajan Foundation's scholarship.  In 2003, he won the First Prize at The Grzegorz Fitelberg International Competition for Conductors (7th) in Katowice, Poland.

Marković was a chief conductor of Tyrolean Opera House from Innsbruck, Austria (Tiroler Landestheater Innsbruck), from 2005 to 2008.  He was a Music Director and Principal Conductor of the Brno Philharmonic Orchestra from 2009 to 2015. Markovic was the Music Director of Opera North for the 2016/2017 season. Today, he is the Principal Guest Conductor of Sinfonia Varsovia (from 2022) and Chief Conductor of Vodvodjanski Symphony Orchestra.

References

External links

 Aleksandar Markovic Official Website
 Maestro Arts agency biography of Aleksandar Markovic 
 Larry L. Lash, 6/23/06, / Der Fliegende Holländer-Tiroler Landestheater, Opera News.
 Martin Wilkening, 03.09.2011, / Wie beim Schaulaufen, Berliner Zeitung.
 Larry L. Lash, 2/7/08, / Cavalleria Rusticana & Pagliacci, Opera News.
 'Facing the music: Aleksandar Marković'.  The Guardian, 22 August 2016
 Berliner Morgenpost, 28. April 2009, Joseph Haydn gefällt auch den jungen Leuten

1975 births
Living people
Male conductors (music)
Serbian conductors (music)
21st-century Austrian conductors (music)
21st-century male musicians